Mani Rao (born 28 February 1965) is an Indian poet and independent scholar, writing in English.

Biography
Mani Rao has authored twelve poetry collections and three books in translation from Sanskrit including the works of Kalidasa, a translation of the Bhagavad Gita as a poem, and a translation of the tantric hymn Saundarya Lahari, besides an anthropological study of mantra-practice called "Living Mantra: Mantra, Deity and Visionary Experience Today."

Translations of Rao's poems have been published in Kannada, Latin, Italian, Korean, Chinese, Arabic, French, German and Kannada. Rao has had poems published in literary journals including Poetry Magazine, Fulcrum, Wasafiri, Meanjin, Washington Square, West Coast Line, Tinfish, and in anthologies including The Penguin Book of the Prose Poem, Language for a New Century: Contemporary Poetry from the Middle East, Asia, and Beyond (W.W. Norton, 2008), and The Bloodaxe Book of Contemporary Indian Poets. (Bloodaxe Books, 2008)  She was a visiting fellow at the Iowa International Writing Program in 2005 and 2009, held the 2006 University of Iowa International Programs writer-in-residence K-12 fellowship, and writing residencies at Omi Ledig House in 2018 and International Poetry Studies Institute (IPSI) Canberra in 2019. She was a co-founder of OutLoud, a regular poetry-reading gathering in Hong Kong, and contributed a poetry segment to RTHK Radio 4.

She performed at literary festivals in India including the Jaipur Literature Festival , Bangalore Literature Festival, Hindu Lit for Life and Apeejay Kolkata Literature Festival,  and at International literature festivals in Hong Kong, Singapore, Melbourne, Vancouver, Chicago, Canberra and New York PEN World Voices.

Rao worked in advertising and television from 1985 to 2004 in Chennai, Mumbai, Hong Kong and Auckland. In Hong Kong, Rao worked for Star (TV) Group Ltd for 9 years, and was the Senior Vice-President of Marketing and Corporate Communications. She spearheaded the 'Kaun Banega Crorepati' marketing campaign (Who Wants to be a Millionaire). She has an MFA from the University of Nevada-Las Vegas and a PhD in Religious Studies from Duke University.

Select reviews 
	 
(On Saundarya Lahari) ‘Mani Rao’s translations have a hard-won simplicity and ripeness. This joyful rendition of an iconic text will offer its share of literary delight, as well as a key to a deeper alchemy. These translations with their ease and lightness of touch will resonate with lovers of poetry as well as travellers on the path of the Divine Feminine."- Arundhathi Subramaniam. 
	 
From Listing in The Oxford Companion to Modern Poetry, (Eds. Ian Hamilton & Jeremy Noel-Tod. Oxford University Press, 2013. 2nd Edition): "Rao's version of the Bhagavad Gita (Autumn Hill / Penguin, 2010 / 2011) unpacks the original Sanskrit with a range of avant garde techniques—with regards to prosody, diction, mise-en-page and lineation—rendering a new translation of the well-known philosophical text unlike any before it."
	 
“The great virtue of The Bhagavad Gita is courage, and in her luminous new translation, Rao is courageous indeed. Her lines venture to keep pace with the original, stride for stride, revelation for revelation. As Wittgenstein wrote, 'courage is always original." I can avow that Rao's is the first truly original version of this sacred text to appear in decades." – Donald Revell
	 
“Mani Rao has transformed the most famous spiritual poem in India to a multi-layered poem, giving shapes to multiple meanings and sounds to multiple forms. Just as Arjuna saw the universe in Krishna's mouth and like the endless tree, the tree of life, which reveals its roots above and leaves below, Mani Rao has shown us this universe, this endless life with its supporting philosophy, as a poem to be perceived directly, intuitively, cutting through reason and linearity to arrive at the underlying undying poetry and grace of this epic work."– Frederick Smith
	 
"Here is a poet who works by daring – daring herself and the reader – to let go. She works in the dark with wit and knife and punch and paper scissors. She cuts and pastes, leaves gaping holes. Her work is a black masque in which parts of speech change parts, and all have the rightness of electronic rain. In the best poems you hear and feel and watch a current – which straight prose insulates as meaning–go crackling from naked line to line, making the unrepeatable pattern that is momentary sense. It's like watching lightning fork. Mani Rao has a strong bleak voice. It's the voice of the voyager: it discommodes, rattles you, shakes you down. Her poetry is sleepless and unwinking. You go to it for debriefing, for the jolt you expect from good writing. And you go back — or she pursues you. She is the hawker you thought you shook off in the square, she is your mechanic come home to spend the night. Let her in: you’ll live to regret it, but at least you’ll live." – Allan Sealy

Bibliography 
Books and Chapbooks
 Saundarya Lahari (HarperCollins, 2022).
Love Me in a Hurry/"Bega Preethsu Nanna" bilingual with Kannada translation by Prathibha Nandakumar (Atta Galatta, Bangalore, 2022).
Sing to Me (Recent Work Press, 2019).
 Living Mantra – Mantra, Deity and Visionary Experience Today (Palgrave Macmillan, 2019).
 Bhagavad Gita (Fingerprint, 2015). (This edition includes a translation of Ishavasyopanishad).
 New & Selected Poems (Poetrywala, India, 2014).
 Echolocation (Math Paper Press, Singapore, 2014).
 Kalidasa for the 21st Century Reader (Aleph Book Co. 2014)
 Bhagavad Gita – A translation of the poem," (Autumn Hill Books, 2010) (Penguin India, 2011). Ghostmasters,  (Hong Kong: Chameleon Press, 2010)
 Mani Rao:100 Poems, 1985–2005,  (Hong Kong: Chameleon Press, 2006)
 Echolocation  (Hong Kong: Chameleon Press, 2003)
 Salt (Hong Kong: Asia 2000)
 The Last Beach (Bilingual with Chinese translation. Trans. Huang Chan Lan. Hong Kong: Asia 2000, 1999)
 Living Shadows (Bilingual with Chinese translation. Trans. Huang Chan Lan. Drawings Mani Rao. Hong Kong: HK Arts Development Council, 1997)
 Catapult Season (Calcutta: Writers Workshop, 1993)
 Wing Span'' (Calcutta: Writers Workshop, 1987)
Essays

 “Decoding Augustine via Saussure.” In-Between Journal of Literary Criticism (Sep 2009). 131-139.  
 “Repetitiveness in Gita translations.” eXchanges (Winter 2009).  
 “Caterpillar to Butterfly: Thoreau’s dietary journey.” Thoreau Society Bulletin (Issue 270, 2010). 
 “Reading the Rigveda.” Indian Literature (Issue 262. Vol LV. No 2. March-April 2011).
 “Automatic Writing – Real, Surreal, Indeterminate.” Fulcrum (Issue 7, 2011). 
 Lorine Niedecker Condens.” Interim (Vol.28 No.1 & 2, 2010 and Vol 29 issue 3, 2012). Using only Niedecker’s words, a poem-essay of her poetic principles.
 Review of Arvind K. Mehrotra’s Songs of Kabir. Translation Review (Vol 83, 2012). 
 “A Brief History of the Bhagavad Gita’s Canonization.” Religion Compass, Nov 2013. 
 “Preface” to Autobiography of a Goddess— Andal,” a translation by Priya Sarukkai Chabbria and Ravi Shankar. New Delhi: Zubaan Books, 2016. 
 “Up, Down, Up.” Review of Availalable Light by C.P.Surendran. Scroll. 11 Nov 2017.
 “Experience of Srividya at Devipuram.” Religions 2019, 10, 14; doi:10.3390/rel10010014. 
 The Conjuring of Atman in Gita translations. Osmania Journal of English Studies, 2019.

References

External links 
 Interview in POV by Usha Akella (2020). "The Power of Mantra."
Interview by PTI (24 Feb 2019). "Ancient Wisdom in Modern Times."
Interview in Scroll (7 Oct 2018) by Rohini Kejriwal. "It's how they roll on your tongue that matters..."
Interview in DNA India (20 Oct 2015) by Latha Srinivasan. 
Interview in Kitaab by Zafar Anjum (2 Nov 2014). “Poetry for me is an intense form of writing."
Interview in South China Morning Post (30 May 2010) by Mark Footer. "My Life."
Review of "Sing to Me" in Business Standard News (16 Nov 2019) by Uttaran Das Gupta. "Myths and Modernity." 
Review of "New and Selected Poems" in Indian Literature by Rati Agnihotri. "Three-Dimensional Poetry." Vol. 61, No. 1 (297), 21st Century Indian Poetry in English (January/February 2017), pp. 206-209.
Review of "Bhagavad Gita" in Asymptote by Eric M Gurevitch
Review of "Ghostmasters" in Cha: An Asian Literary Journal by Reid Mitchell. "Learning to Hear Mani Rao."
Review of "Ghostmasters" in Mascara Literary Review (1 Jan 2011) by Amos Toh. 
Review of "echolocation" in QLRS (Vol. 3 No. 4 Jul 2004) by Cyril Wong. "Locating Logos."
Poem "My Old Woman" in Poetry Magazine (July/August 2019). 
"Poem, Sisyphus" in Omniverse.

Poems from "Ghostmasters" in Almost Island (Monsoon 2009). 
Poems from "echolocation" in Softblow
Excerpts from translation of Bhagavad Gita in eXchanges: Journal of Literary Translation (Exocity, Winter 2009)
 Excerpts from translation of Kalidasa's Ritusamharam in Almost Island
Excerpts from translation of Kalidasa's Meghadutam in Poetry at Sangam
Conversation with Devdutt Pattanaik at Bangalore Literature Festival (3 Feb 2016)
Conversation with Chitra Mahesh at Hindu Lit for Life 2019 about Mani Rao's book Living Mantra.
Conversation with Lata Mani at Atta Galatta about Mani Rao's Bhagavad Gita translation 2015

 Author’s Website
 Poets & Writers > Directory of Writers > Mani Rao
 Author's page on Facebook for literary updates https://www.facebook.com/maniraopoem/
Author's page on Facebook for updates on Living Mantra: https://www.facebook.com/bookonmantra/
 Author's Twitter handler

Indian women poets
Living people
1965 births
English-language poets from India
Indian women translators
International Writing Program alumni
Women writers of young adult literature
20th-century Indian poets
20th-century Indian women writers
20th-century Indian translators